The Croton Water Filtration Plant, is a drinking water treatment facility in New York City which began operation in 2015. The plant construction cost was over $3 billion, The facility was built  under Van Cortlandt Park's Mosholu Golf Course in the Bronx.

Background
Through the early 21st century, the three aqueduct systems that supply water to the city utilized chlorination technology, but not filtration (unlike other large municipal water systems in the US). The water in the Croton Aqueduct system, the oldest of the three, often had high turbidity levels, which limits the effectiveness of chlorination as a disinfection process. The turbidity problems in the Croton Watershed come from naturally occurring sources and urban runoff pollution. The Croton system supplies about ten percent of the New York City water system and building a filtration system to address the turbidity problems had been proposed since the 1990s.

The Croton filtration plant was built after a lawsuit was filed in 1997 against the City of New York by the U.S. Environmental Protection Agency (EPA), the U.S. Department of Justice and the State of New York. The city settled the suit and a consent decree was issued with the condition that the city would build the plant by 2006. The city had been studying possible sites for such a plant for more than 20 years in both the Bronx and nearby Westchester County. The plant protects the public from Giardia and Cryptosporidium, microorganisms which can cause serious health problems.

In the city's early plans, it considered that one of the Croton plant's additional benefits would be to reduce the city's dependence on its two other water sources, the Catskill Aqueduct and Delaware Aqueduct, which at the time were only minimally filtered. Subsequently the city built the Catskill-Delaware Water Ultraviolet Disinfection Facility, which began operation in 2013.

Design
Raw water is delivered to the filtration plant by the New Croton Aqueduct and the Jerome Park Reservoir. The system uses conventional drinking water treatment technologies:
 Coagulation and flocculation, and chemical balancing
 Dissolved air flotation and dual media filtration (activated coal and sand)
 Ultraviolet and chlorine disinfection
 Corrosion control (orthophosphate)
 Fluoridation.

Project delays, costs and completion
The filtration plant was originally projected to cost $800 million, but the project experienced delays and ballooning costs due to objections from the local community, which required the city to propose alternate sites for such a plant. 

To lessen the disruption caused by the plant's construction, in 2010 the city used mitigation funds from the construction budget to restore the Van Cortlandt Park Parade Ground. The Sachkerah Woods Playground, located at the park's southeast corner near the Mosholu Golf Course, was also built using Croton mitigation funds. 
The new plant allowed the city to provide greater capacity for its water system. This was especially important since the city was preparing to shut off part of the Delaware Aqueduct in 2022 allowing the completion of a tunnel that would bypass a leaking section of the aqueduct in Newburgh, New York.

In May 2015 the New York City Department of Environmental Protection announced that the Croton filtration plant had been recently activated. The final project cost was $3.2 billion. The  plant is larger than Yankee Stadium.

References

Sources

External links 
 Activation of Croton Filtration Plant - Construction photos by NYCDEP

Environment of New York City
Water treatment facilities
Norwood, Bronx
2015 establishments in New York City
Water infrastructure of New York City